Ranganathan (Tamil: ரங்கநாதன்) is a South Indian name. It is derived from the Sanskrit name Ranganatha, which is the name of the Hindu god Vishnu, as depicted resting on the nāga Shesha. The name derives from the Sanskrit words ranga, meaning "place of assembly," and nath, meaning "protector," and thus by extension the name literally means "protector of the place of assembly."

It may refer to:

S. R. Ranganathan, mathematician and librarian
T. Ranganathan, musician
R. Madhavan, film actor
B. Ranganathan, breast cancer technologist
Ramesh Ranganathan, Chief Justice of Uttarakhand High Court.
Romesh Ranganathan, English stand-up comedian

Indian surnames
Indian given names
Tamil masculine given names